Joe Blackman  (born c. 1984) is an entrepreneur and former CEO of Collection 26 (formerly called Green Ant Events), a luxury event-planning company. He previously sat as a magistrate at the Cardiff Magistrates Courts.

Event planning

Blackman was raised with two siblings in Llantwit Major, near Cardiff, Wales by his single mother, who was an events manager at St Donat's Art Centre.  He began working on events run by his mother, before starting his first business while in university.

In 2005 when he was 20 years old, Blackman founded Green Ant Events, an event-planning company.  Venture Wales, a business-support project of the Welsh government, supported Blackman's efforts with business advice.  The company organised an event in Qatar at the 15th Asian Games for the International Olympics Committee. In 2008 during a recession he changed its focus to luxury events for wealthy clients.  In 2010 he moved the business to Notting Hill in London to be closer to his target market.  In 2013 the name of the company was changed to Collection 26. It threw parties for celebrities including 50 Cent, The Killers, and Premier League footballers. The company was sold in 2017, and the assets were returned to its investors by January 2018.

Blackman was appointed Member of the Order of the British Empire (MBE) in the 2022 New Year Honours for services to the economy and charity.

Education
Blackman started working on a BA degree in Stage Management at the Royal Welsh College of Music & Drama in 2003 and 2004 but left to start freelancing. He qualified in health and safety management by NEBOSH. and then earned a master's degree in Business Administration from the University of South Wales with funding from the Welsh government.

Magistrate service

Blackman became a magistrate in Cardiff in 2008. At the age of 23, he was the youngest magistrate on the Cardiff bench, and one of the youngest in the UK.

References

1984 births
Living people
Welsh businesspeople
People associated with the University of South Wales
Members of the Order of the British Empire